Flexopteron poppei is a species of sea snail, a marine gastropod mollusk in the family Muricidae, the murex snails or rock snails.

Description
The size of an adult shell varies between 18 mm and 52 mm.

Distribution
This species occurs in the Pacific Ocean off the Philippines.

References

 Merle D., Garrigues B. & Pointier J.-P. (2011) Fossil and Recent Muricidae of the world. Part Muricinae. Hackenheim: Conchbooks. 648 pp. page(s): 169

External links
 Houart, R. & Héros, V. (2015). New species of Muricidae Rafinesque, 1815 (Mollusca: Gastropoda) from the Western Indian Ocean. Zoosystema. 37 (3): 481-503
 

Muricinae
Gastropods described in 1993